Charles Frederick Bishop (19 August 1879 – 27 October 1943) played first-class cricket for Somerset in 1920 and 1921. He was born in Down End, Horsley, Gloucestershire, and died at Stonehouse, Plymouth, Devon.

Bishop played in just two first-class matches for Somerset as a middle-order batsman, one in each of the 1920 and 1921 seasons. Though he was never out without scoring, he was not successful, making in all only nine runs in four first-class innings, with a highest of an undefeated 3 in the 1920 match against Leicestershire.

References

1879 births
1943 deaths
English cricketers
Somerset cricketers